Jalaludin Ansari was an Indian politician. He was a Member of Parliament, representing Bihar in the Rajya Sabha, the upper house of India's Parliament, as a member of the Communist Party of India.

References

Rajya Sabha members from Bihar
Communist Party of India politicians from Bihar
1942 births
2017 deaths